Elger may refer to:

 Herbert Elger, German luger in the late 1920s
 Thomas Gwyn Elger (1836–1897), British astronomer and selenographer
 William Elger (1891–1946), General Secretary of the Scottish Trades Union Congress (from 1922)
 Elger (crater), a lunar crater named after the above

See also
 Elgar (disambiguation)